A trip to Karabakh (Gaseirneba Karabaghshi in Georgian) is a 2005 Georgian film directed by Levan Tutberidze and based on the 1992 novel "Journey to Karabakh" by Aka Morchiladze.

Plot
A group of teenage boys from Tbilisi take a trip to Azerbaijan to buy drugs, and end up fighting in the first Nagorno-Karabakh War, when they are captured by Azerbaijani militants, with one subsequently being captured by the Armenians. During the course of events, the main character has flashbacks to his relationship with his father, as well as a depressive prostitute.

Cast
 Levan Doborjginidze - Gio
 Mikheil Meskhi - Gogliko
 Dato Iashvili 
 Nutsa Kukhianidze - Jana
 Giorgi Gachechiladze - Utsnobi
 Gogi Kharabadze - Tengizi
 Nino Kasradze - Nana 
 Robert Sturua
 Dasha Drozdovskaja - Journalist
 Giorgi Gurgulia
 Sandro Kakulia
 Sandro Qutidze - Irakli

Awards
 Grand Prize, Kinoshok - Open CIS and Baltic Film Festival
 FIPRESCI Prize, Tbilisi International Film Festival

External links

2005 films
Adventure drama films from Georgia (country)
2000s Georgian-language films
Nagorno-Karabakh War films
2000s adventure drama films